Bellonia is a genus of flowering plants in the family Gesneriaceae, native to Cuba and Hispaniola. They have floral characters suggesting that they are buzz pollinated.

Species
Currently accepted species include:

Bellonia aspera L.
Bellonia spinosa Sw.

References

Gesnerioideae
Gesneriaceae genera